Council of Ministers at Home was a part of the Polish Government in Exile residing in occupied Poland. It was the top executive of the Polish Underground State, created on 26 July 1944 from Government Delegate's Office at Home. It was led by Polish deputy prime minister, Jan Stanisław Jankowski, and divided into departments representative of pre-war Polish ministries and other offices. Most of its members, including Jankowski, were arrested on 27 March 1945 by NKVD and sentenced in the Trial of the Sixteen. The remaining leaders of the Underground State decided not to recreate the Council.

Poland in World War II
Polish Underground State